Aetnaville may refer to:

Aetnaville Bridge, a bridge connecting Bridgeport, Ohio to Wheeling, West Virginia
Aetnaville, Kentucky, a community in Ohio County, Kentucky